Doğan Kuban (10 April 1926 – 22 September 2021) was a Turkish architectural historian.

Biography
Kuban was born in Paris.

He received his bachelor's degree in architecture from Istanbul Technical University (ITU). Shortly thereafter he started his academic career. In the 1960s and 1970s he spent time as a research fellow at the Dumbarton Oaks Research Library with a scholarship from Harvard University. He became a professor in 1965, and he retıred recently. Among his other work, he aided Professor Cecil L. Striker, of the University of Pennsylvania, in his scholarly restoration of the Kalenderhane Mosque in Istanbul.

Kuban's urban history of Istanbul—one of the more complete diachronic histories of the city—is available in English as Istanbul: An Urban History. Byzantion, Constantinopolis, Istanbul (Istanbul, 1996). He died on 22 September 2021 at the age of 95.

See also
 List of Turkish architects
 Ottoman architecture

References

Bibliography
 Mimarlık Kavramları (1998)  
 İstanbul Yazıları (1998) 
 Sinan: an Architectural Genius (1999); text by Doğan Kuban, photographs by Ahmet Ertuğ
 İstanbul Bir Kent Tarihi (2000) 
 Tarihi Çevre Korumanın Mimarlık Boyutu (2000) 
 Türkiye'de Kentsel Koruma (2001)

External links
 Biyografi.net - Biography of Doğan Kuban 
 Ykykultur.com.tr - Biography of Doğan Kuban 

1926 births
2021 deaths
Writers from Paris
Harvard University people
Recipients of TÜBİTAK Service Award
Turkish writers